Somba language may refer to:
Somba, a dialect of the Somba-Siawari language

See also
Somba, the people who speak the languages of the Eastern branch of the Oti–Volta languages